Jeong Bo-seok (born 1961) is a South Korean actor.

Filmography

Television series

Film

Television  show

Theater

Awards and nominations

References

External links
Jung Bo-seok Fan Cafe at Daum 

South Korean male television actors
South Korean male film actors
South Korean male stage actors
1961 births
Living people
People from Naju